Khalq Sozi (People's Word) is a state-run Uzbek language newspaper published from Uzbekistan.

History and profile
Khalq Sozi is a government-owned publication. Abbashon Usmanov was the editor-in-chief of the daily until July 2006. Shukhrat Jabborov succeeded him in the post.

Khalq Sozi has a Russian language sister publication, Narodnoye Slovo.

References

External links 
BBC Uzbekistan media

Newspapers published in Uzbekistan
Publications with year of establishment missing
State media
Uzbek-language newspapers